The 1891–92 Rugby Union County Championship was the fourth edition of England's premier rugby union club competition at the time.

Yorkshire won the competition for the third time, defeating all three of their opponents in the Championship Series.

Draw and Results

Group Winners

Championship Series

Squad
J Bedford (Wakefield Trinity)
Tom Broadley (Bingley)
Harry Bradshaw (Bramley)
Arthur Briggs (Bradford)
William Bromet (capt) (Tadcaster)
E Dewhirst (Bradford)
E Dickenson (Huddersfield)
Jack Dyson (Huddersfield)
Charles Emmott (Bradford)
O Fletcher (Halifax)
Albert Goldthorpe (Hunslet)
Walter Goldthorpe (Hunslet)
E Hudson (Leeds)
Donald Jowett (Heckmondwike)
Richard Lockwood (Heckmondwike)
William Nicholl (Brighouse Rangers)
C J F Paisley (Huddersfield)
Jack Rathmell (Hunslet)
J Redman (Manningham)
T Summersgill (Leeds)
John Toothill (Bradford)
R Wood (Brighouse Rangers)

See also
 English rugby union system
 Rugby union in England

References

Rugby Union County Championship
County Championship (rugby union) seasons